CL-41 may refer to:

, a Brooklyn-class light cruiser that served in the United States Navy
Canadair CL-41 Tutor, a Canadian jettrainer aircraft
 Chlorine-41 (Cl-41 or 41Cl), an isotope of chlorine